Winton Brian Pickering (born 8 December 1962) is a Cook Islands politician and former member of the Cook Islands Parliament, representing the seat of Oneroa.  He is a member of the Cook Islands Democratic Party.

Pickering was born on Rarotonga and attended Avarua and Nikao Side School Primary Schools and Nukutere College.  He was first elected to Parliament at the 2004 election. He was re-elected at the 2010 election. He did not stand in the 2014 election.

References

1962 births
Living people
Members of the Parliament of the Cook Islands
People from Rarotonga
People from Mangaia
Democratic Party (Cook Islands) politicians
People educated by New Zealand Christian Brothers